Bisa is a surname and a feminine given name. People with the name include:

Surname
 Acel Bisa, Filipino musician
 Ingrid Bisa (born 1978), Italian politician

Given name
 Bisa Butler (born 1973), American fiber artist
 Bisa Grant (born 1976), American athlete 
 Bisa Williams (born 1954), American diplomat

Stage name
 Bisa Kdei, stage name of Ronald Kwaku Dei Appiah (born 1986), Ghanaian musician

See also
 Bisa, disambiguation page

Feminine given names